The men's 100 metre breaststroke event at the 2000 Summer Olympics took place on 16–17 September at the Sydney International Aquatic Centre in Sydney, Australia.

Domenico Fioravanti made an Olympic milestone to become Italy's first ever gold medalist in swimming. He stormed home on the final lap to establish a new Olympic standard of 1:00.46, cutting off Frédérik Deburghgraeve's 1996 record by 0.14 seconds. U.S. swimmer Ed Moses enjoyed a strong lead on the first length of the pool, but ended up only with a silver in 1:00.73. Meanwhile, Russia's world record holder Roman Sloudnov took the bronze in 1:00.91.

Japan's Kosuke Kitajima, who later emerged as the world's top breaststroke swimmer of the decade, pulled off a fourth-place finish in 1:01.34. Czech Republic's Daniel Málek earned a fifth spot in a national record of 1:01.50, and was followed in sixth by Canada's Morgan Knabe with a time of 1:01.58. South Africa's Brett Petersen (1:01.63) and Switzerland's Remo Lütolf (1:01.88) closed out the field.

Notable swimmers failed to reach the top 8 final, featuring four-time Olympians Károly Güttler of Hungary and Mark Warnecke of Germany, Australia's overwhelming favorite Phil Rogers, and New Zealand's Steven Ferguson, the son of former Olympic champion Ian Ferguson, who later became one of the most successful kayakers in the sport.

Shortly before the next Olympics, Fioravanti was forced to retire from swimming after failing a routine medical test carried by the Italian National Olympic Committee. Tests revealed that he was diagnosed with a genetic heart anomaly.

Records
Prior to this competition, the existing world and Olympic records were as follows.

The following new world and Olympic records were set during this competition.

Results

Heats

Semifinals

Semifinal 1

Semifinal 2

Final

References

External links
Official Olympic Report

B
Men's events at the 2000 Summer Olympics